Beaucoup is an unincorporated community in Beaucoup Township, Washington County, Illinois, United States. On October 12, 1948, Thomas E. Dewey gave a speech to a crowd of 1,000 during his presidential campaign.

References

Unincorporated communities in Washington County, Illinois
Unincorporated communities in Illinois